Shethanei Lake is a lake in northern Manitoba, Canada. Located southwest of Caribou River Park Reserve, it is the source of the Seal River.

Lakes of Manitoba